The Sufi Centre Rabbaniyya (formerly Sufi Centre Berlin) by the Sufi-Master Sheikh Eşref Efendi is a group of the Naqshbandi Sufi Order in Germany.

History 

The Sufi Centre Rabbaniyya and the head of the centre, Sheikh Eşref Efendi, belong to the Naqshbandi Sufi Order. The title of the Naqshbandi Sufi Order has changed throughout the centuries. According to the handed-down tradition of Sufi masters, the lineage of the Sufi order can be traced back to the Prophet Mohammed himself.

The knowledge and the secrets of the Prophet Mohammed have been passed down throughout the centuries in an unbroken chain of  40 grandsheikhs (silsila) up until today. The wisdom and knowledge is embodied today by Grandsheikh Nazim al Rabbani.

Grandsheikh Nazim Al Rabbani gave his student, Eşref Goekcimen, the duty to give seekers in Germany, Bosnia and Turkey spiritual advice and to guide them in the Naqshbandi tradition.

In 1994 a small group of people met up with Sheikh Esref Efendi in the Bellermanstrasse in Wedding to become the nucleus of the community. In 1998 after the Bosnian War Efendi and some of his students went to Bosnia to offer humanitarian aid and assistance to people there.

Subsequently, the group, which had grown to have approximately 40 members, travelled to Cyprus in 1999, to live there among the community of their Grandmaster, Maulana Sheikh Nazim el Rabbani. They stayed there for about six months until 2000.

As they returned to Berlin the meetings initially took place in private residences, until the Sufi Centre Berlin opened its doors in the Reuterstrasse in Neukoelln in 2003. In 2008 the centre moved to the Wissmannstrasse 20, also in Neukoelln.

In October 2010 Grandsheikh Nazim declared the global solution, all believers shall unite as "servants of God", which is expressed in Arabic with the word "Rabbaniyya". As a response to this declaration the Sufi Centre Berlin changed its name to Sufi Centre Rabbaniyya.

After Nazim al Rabbani died in 2014, the group restructured in November 2014, closed the center in berlin, opened a new one in Cologne and moved to "sufiland" in Eigeltingen-Reute (Lake Constance), which was newly opened too.

Prevalence 
The majority of the members of the community practice their practices at home and only visit the centre from time to time whenever they need advice for important matters of life, which they can receive from the head of the centre, Sheikh Efendi.

It is unknown how many people would consider themselves as being a member of or as belonging to a Sufi Order. People who are interested in Sufism or are practicing can come and go whenever they wish. "Come whoever you are...", as Rumi's saying expresses the motto of his Order of the Whirling Dervishes, the Sufi Centre Rabbaniyya also welcomes its guest under the same premise every weekend.

It is not common for a small group or a Sufi Order in general to operate a membership list, or any type of registration of members. There are small groups or individuals in all areas of Berlin who meet in private to pray or meditate together.

Governance 
Eşref Goekcimen was born in Mersin, Turkey, in 1964. Being a direct descendant of advisors to the Ottoman Sultans, he and his sisters and brother were raised by his parents in the tradition of Islamic beliefs. The family moved to Berlin in 1972. During his adolescence he frequently visited many libraries and mosques where he could study old works of religious literature.

In 1995 he met the last Grandsheikh of the Naqshbandi silsila, Grandsheikh Nazim al Rabbani. He began to study Nazim's teachings and accepted him as his teacher and joined the Naqshbandiyya. The silsila (or golden chain) of the Naqshbandi tradition can be traced back through all grandsheikhs to Muhammed, who in Islam is regarded as the last and hence the seal of the prophets. Grandsheikh Nazim Al Rabbani is a descendant of the bloodline of  Mohammed himself. He authorized Sheikh Eşref Efendi in 1996 to serve as a spiritual guide and advisor in the tradition of the Naqshbandi tariqa.

As is custom in the tradition, Efendi began delivering  (spiritual addresses) in Berlin and quickly a community of people gathered around him. In 1998 he took off to Bosnia with some of his students to offer reconstructing and humanitarian aid after the war in Bosnia. In a joint effort they helped with the reconstruction of the burial site of Sari Saltuk (also known as Baba Sari Saltik or Saltuk Baba), a 13th-century saint.

Today he is known as Sheikh Eşref Efendi and founder of the Sufi Centre Berlin (Europäische Mitte für interspirituelle Begegnungen = European Center for Inter-spiritual Encounters). He has also initiated the launch of Sufi Centres in Radolfzell/Bodensee (Lake Constance), Cologne, Eigeltingen/Reute and Ludwigshafen. Due to the growing interest Efendi's influence has also spread to Austria, Belgium, Bulgaria, France, Denmark, Norway, the Netherlands, United Kingdom, Switzerland and Slovenia.

Teachings

Naqshibandyya 
The followers of the Naqshibandyya tradition live within an Islamic framework of belief, i.e., they believe in the Torah of Moses and the Gospel of Jesus, as well as the Quran of Mohammed. Their life is directed by the example and the rules of the last messenger, Mohammed.

The greatest distinction between Sufism and many other Islamic pathways is the practice of the quiet or loud dhikr. The continuous remembering of God can support the human soul in finding back to its origin and realizing its true value.

The students of the Naqshibandi order believe in the prophecies of Mohammed. According to these prophecies, the current times are humanity’s last days or the days of Armageddon. At the height of these dark times they are expecting the appearance of a saviour, Imam Mahdi, and the second coming of Jesus.

Rabbaniyya 
Rabbaniyya means "true servanthood". Rabbaniyya is the way to live as a servant of the creator. This is the essence, the seed of every spiritual path. The most important purpose of all religions is to lead humanity to the divine love and the art of true servanthood.

Worship and practices

Sohbet 
"Our path is the way of the sohbet (association)" said Shah Naqshband, the 12th grandsheikh of the Silsila. The tradition of the cleaning of the heart through the word of God and the breath of a prophet or a saint can be traced back to the Prophet Mohammed and all other prophets of the Bible and the Torah, who have come before him. They all had the task to talk to humanity in parables about God and the soul as well as delivering messages, commandments and rules which would lead humanity onto a God-pleasing path and would ease their lives. Parables and metaphors are used for easy comprehension.

In the Sufi Centre Berlin such  take place at least once per week, usually on Fridays. Sheikh Efendi or one of his authorized students speak at about 8pm. Such an address may generally last anything from 45–90 minutes, but there is no pre-set time limit.  are delivered without preparation and they offer that which is of benefit to all attendants.

Dhikr 
Dhikr is the remembrance of God and is equivalent to chanting of mantras in other religions. Dhikr includes praises of God, recitations of his names, certain surahs of the Quran and remembrance of the Prophet. Dhikr can be performed either quietly in a meditation style manner or loudly in a group with a dervish whirling in the middle or with Haḍra. The Sheikh or an authorized student is leader of the dhikr. He determines the contents and the intensity of the chanting and the dancing.

Current developments 
In 2006 students of Efendi received the authorization to guide the local communities of Eigeltingen/Reute near Lake Constance, Cologne and Ludwigshafen in the Naqshibandi tradition. They were authorized by Efendi to perform  and lead dhikrs.

In 2009 Efendi was given a new task by grandsheikh Nazim and the Sufi Centre became the "Europaeische Mitte fuer interspirituelle Begenungen" (the Centre for Inter-spiritual Encounters).

Since then the interspiritual and interfaith dialogue has been promoted even more. On many occasions representatives of other religions and traditions have been invited to facilitate talks about their own paths and visit with their students.

Many German members of the community go on spiritual trips and pilgrimages to Islamic spiritual centres with Efendi and his longstanding students. For example, big groups have travelled to visit grandsheikh Nazim al Rabbani in Cyprus. There have also been trips to the holy places of Damascus, Bosnia and umrah and hajj pilgrimages to Mecca and Medina.

Organisation 
In 2004 about 25 members of the Sufi community founded the non-profit organization "Der wahre Mensch e.V." In 2007 the organization received approval of the status of a charitable foundation.

Guiding principles 
A "true human" is enabled to balance the spiritual and worldly aspects of himself and thus keep a harmonious equilibrium. According to the understanding of the Sufis this ability can be seen in how people control their lives within any given social structures on one hand and in inner peace and orientation towards universal truths on the other hand.

Accordingly, they are working towards mutual tolerance and respect in society, they promote the idea of different cultures living together peacefully and in a considerate manner. Above all, they encourage respect for the laws of life regardless of faith or culture.

They regard their mission as giving hope to people who feel hopeless and in supporting people who are in need of help. They want to help those who have lost their way in finding orientation through lasting and sustainable values and they would like to give those who feel stable within their lives the opportunity to work on balancing and harmonizing society.

The purpose of the work 
The members of the foundation have set following aims to their work:
Alleviation of social hardship, integration work for different districts of town, improvement of the understanding of diverse cultures and ethnic groups amongst each other, encourage cultural exchange of different ethnic groups in society, conveyance of general values that reach beyond culture and religion, prevention of discrimination and facilitation of education through group activities.

Hierarchy 

Directorship and the highest level of decision making power in regards to all matters relating to the Sufi Centre are held by Efendi. His students and several other members of the foundation take care of other areas such as being of assistance to the members of community, taking care of the youth, planning programmes, overseeing domestic matters such as the kitchen and catering, administration, support and advice, co-ordination and organization of general community matters and group trips.

Finance 

All activities of the charitable foundation and the upkeep of the centre are financed by donations of members and guests. Travel and accommodation expenses are paid by each member themselves if they take part in a group excursion or trip. The organizers always attempt to keep the costs of such trips as low as possible as to make it more affordable for families, the elderly and the unemployed.

Publishing 
The company New Ottomans Verlag (New Ottomans Publishing) was founded in 2004 and collaborates with Spohr Verlag. They publish literature on Sufism and Islam as well as all works of Efendi (see literature). Various periodicals published articles about the spiritual path and the teachings of Efendi.

Youth work 
The foundation places special emphasis on offering meaningful spare time activities. A weekly address or speech is on offer for the youth. Young people are often given tasks to support the community, e.g., helping with house moves and other supporting activities.

One major aim is the prevention of violence and drug abuse as well as the integration of young people with ethnic minority background.

Charitable activities 

The Sufi Centre offers many services for free such as: spiritual counselling, individual meetings with authorized members, social support (e.g., ALG II, crisis support, mediation, psychological counselling (couple and family supervision and conflict solving), Sufi healing methods (e.g., natural health modalities, yoga, meditation, Sufi whirling), mutual support for renovations, house moves and family problems.

Interfaith dialogue 
In 2009 Sheikh Eşref Efendi was given a new task by Grandsheikh Nazim and the Sufi Centre became the Europäische Mitte fuer interspirituelle Begenungen (the European Center for Interspiritual Encounters). Since then the interspiritual and interfaith dialogue has been promoted even more.

On many occasions representatives of other religions and traditions have been invited to facilitate talks about their own paths to God and their own methods. The various Sufi centers have hosted other spiritual/religious teachers and their students numerous times.

Increasingly more and more institutions refer to the Sufi Centre Berlin as an authority regarding questions on Islam and Sufism. Radio stations and TV channels as well as various university students of subjects such as anthropology, communication studies, cultural science, theology, Islamic studies, etc. contact the centre for information or interviews. Even school pupils visit the centre or invite representatives of the centre to their school in order to teach pupils about Islam and Sufism.

The Sufi Centre Berlin is registered with the district council as a religious association in Berlin Neukölln. Representatives of the centre are frequently invited to cross-cultural and interfaith events organised by the senate.

Critics of the Sufi path 

Orthodox scholars hold differing opinions regarding music and dance, especially a dance type dhikr, which some hold to be of gentile origin and hence are unislamic. However, many scholars and Sufis hold a differing perspective, arguing that the Prophet Mohammed was welcomed with music by the people of Medina as he entered the town. When the question arose if the music shall stop, the Prophet answered that the people should celebrate happy times with music. These Sufis regard music as an expression of bliss in the divine presence. Also, some Muslims, especially those of the Najdi school, regard the following of a master/sheikh and the adoration of saints as shirk and therefore as a great sin; however this is a minority position that most orthodox scholars disagree with.

Publications by Sheikh Eşref Efendi 

 Sheikh Eşref Efendi: Trinke aus der Quelle der Weisheit New Ottomans Verlag, Berlin, Juli 2004, 
 Sheikh Eşref Efendi: Schlüssel zur Pforte der Schöpfung Pro Business Verlag, Berlin, Juni 2006,

External links
 
 http://www.sufiland.de
 http://www.sufi-braunschweig.de

References

Sufi organizations
Sufism in Europe
Islamic organisations based in Germany
Religion in Berlin